Olga Dmitriyevna Markova (born 22 January 1974) is a Russian former competitive figure skater who currently works as a coach, choreographer, and technical specialist. She is a two-time European medalist (bronze in 1994 and silver in 1995), and the 1994 Russian national champion.

Career 
Markova drew attention for her avant garde style and choreography. Her highest placement at the World Figure Skating Championships was fifth, which she achieved in 1995. That year she was second after the short program, ahead of the eventual gold and silver medalists Lu Chen and Surya Bonaly. Her inability to land a clean triple lutz in the long program dropped her off the podium.

In 1998 Markova turned professional and won a silver medal at the World Professional Figure Skating Championships in Jaca, Spain. She has coached and choreographed for Kristina Oblasova and currently coaches Adrian Alvarado. She is an ISU technical specialist for Russia.

Programs

Results 
GP: Champions Series (Grand Prix)

References

 Skatabase: 1990s Europeans
 Skatabase: 1990s Worlds

Russian female single skaters
Russian figure skating coaches
Figure skating choreographers
International Skating Union technical specialists
Living people
1974 births
European Figure Skating Championships medalists
Figure skaters from Saint Petersburg
Female sports coaches
Competitors at the 1994 Goodwill Games